The Interments (felo de se) Act 1882 (45 & 46 Vict c 19) is an Act of the Parliament of the United Kingdom which allowed a person whose death was felo de se (criminal suicide) to be buried in a churchyard at any hour, and with the usual  religious rites.  Previously, suicides could be buried only between 9pm and midnight, and without rites. Sir James Stephen said that the act was "so worded as to lead any ordinary reader to suppose that till it passed suicides were buried at a crossroads with a stake through their bodies".

The Suicide Act 1961 abolished felo de se and in consequence also repealed the 1882 act.

Section 3
This section allowed interment to be made in any way prescribed or authorised by the Burial Laws Amendment Act 1880. By section 13 of that Act, any clergyman of the Church of England authorised to perform the burial service was permitted, in any case where the office for the burial of the dead according to the rites of the Church of England might not be used, to use at the burial ground such service, consisting of prayers taken from the Book of Common Prayer and portions of the Holy Scripture, as might be prescribed or approved by the ordinary.

See also
 Suicide legislation

References
 Halsbury's Statutes,
 The Public General Statutes, passed in the forty-fifth and forty-sixth years of the reign of Her Majesty Queen Victoria, 1882. Queen's printer. London. 1882. Page 48.

External links

United Kingdom Acts of Parliament 1882
Suicide in the United Kingdom